Patricia Claire Bloom  (born 15 February 1931) is an English actress. She is known for leading roles in plays such as A Streetcar Named Desire, A Doll's House, and Long Day's Journey into Night, and has starred in nearly sixty films.

After a childhood spent in England (and in the US for two-and-a-half years during the Second World War), Bloom studied drama in London. She debuted on the London stage when she was sixteen and took roles in various Shakespeare plays. They included Hamlet, in which she played Ophelia alongside Richard Burton. For her Juliet in Romeo and Juliet, critic Kenneth Tynan stated it was "the best Juliet I've ever seen". After she starred as Blanche DuBois in A Streetcar Named Desire, its playwright, Tennessee Williams, stated, "I declare myself absolutely wild about Claire Bloom".

In 1952, Bloom was cast by Hollywood film star Charlie Chaplin to co-star alongside him in Limelight. During her film career, she has starred alongside numerous major actors, including Richard Burton, Laurence Olivier, John Gielgud, Paul Scofield, Ralph Richardson, Yul Brynner, George C. Scott, James Mason, Paul Newman, Cliff Robertson, Julie Harris, Anthony Hopkins and Rod Steiger.

In 2010, Bloom played the role of Queen Mary in the British film The King's Speech. She was appointed Commander of the Order of the British Empire (CBE) in the 2013 Birthday Honours for services to drama.

Early life
Bloom was born on 15 February 1931 as Patricia Claire Blume in Finchley, then part of Middlesex (now a suburb of North London), the daughter of Elizabeth (née Grew) and Edward Max Blume, a "not very successful" salesman. Her paternal grandparents, originally named Blumenthal, as well as her maternal grandparents, originally named Gravitzky, were Jewish emigrants from Byten in the Grodno region of Russia, now in Belarus, Eastern Europe. She is Russian British and practises Judaism.

Bloom's education was "somewhat haphazard"; she was sent to the independent Badminton School in Bristol, but when her father encountered financial difficulties the family relocated to Cornwall, where she attended the local village school. She later studied stage acting at the Guildhall School of Music and Drama, London, and continued her studies under Elsie Fogerty at the Central School of Speech and Drama, then based in the Royal Albert Hall, London.

After the Luftwaffe began bombing London during the Blitz in 1940, her family had a number of narrow escapes as bombs dropped close to their home. While their father remained in England, she and her brother John went with their mother to the United States, where she spent a year living in Florida with a paternal uncle's family; during this time her mother worked for her aunt's dress shop, "but she proved to be a dreadful saleswoman". She recalls, "It was 1941; I was ten, John was nearly six. We were to sail from Glasgow in a convoy, on a ship that was evacuating children." During her year stay in Florida, she was asked by the British War Relief Society to help raise money by entertaining at various benefits, which she then did for a number of weeks. "Thus I broke into show business singing", she writes. Bloom, along with her mother and brother, next lived in New York with their mother's cousin for another eighteen months before returning to England. It was in New York that she decided to become an actress, after her mother took her to see the Broadway play Three Sisters for her twelfth birthday:

They returned to England in 1943, and due to her father's improved business lived in Mayfair, but her parents' marriage ended shortly afterward – so her father could marry his girlfriend – and she had no contact with him for many years.

Acting career

Stage

After training at the Guildhall School of Music and Drama and the Central School of Speech and Drama, Bloom made her debut on BBC radio programmes. She made her stage debut in 1946 when she was 15 with the Oxford Repertory Theatre.

Bloom debuted aged 16 at the Shakespeare Memorial Theatre as Ophelia to Paul Scofield's Hamlet; Robert Helpmann alternated playing the prince. Bloom has written that during the production she had a crush on Scofield. As Scofield was happily married and the father of a son, Bloom hoped only, "to be flirted with and taken some notice of". She later recalled, "I could never make up my mind which of my two Hamlets I found the more devastating: the openly homosexual, charismatic Helpmann, or the charming, shy young man from Sussex."

When asked about Bloom years later, Scofield recalled, "Sixteen years old I think—so very young and necessarily inexperienced, she looked lovely, she acted with a daunting assurance which belied entirely her inexperience of almost timid reticence. She was a very good Ophelia."

Her London stage debut was in 1947 in the Christopher Fry play The Lady's Not For Burning, which starred Sir John Gielgud and Pamela Brown and featured a young Richard Burton. It also played on Broadway in New York City.
It was during the rehearsals for the play that Burton and Bloom began a long love affair. The following year, she received acclaim for her portrayal of Ophelia in Hamlet starring Burton, the first of many works by William Shakespeare in which Bloom would appear. Although Burton was at that time married to Sybil Christopher, fellow actor and friend of Burton, Stanley Baker, seeing how attracted he was to Bloom, commented that he "thought that this might be the time when Rich actually left Sybil." In his later years, Burton told his biographer, Michael Munn, "'I only ever loved two women before Elizabeth,' Sybil was one, Claire Bloom the other."

In a 2002 interview with Michael Shelden, Bloom said of Burton, "He had it all: intelligence, physical beauty, an incredible voice. There was no one else like him. When we were at the Old Vic, he proved that a working-class actor could make it, and I was proud of him. I thought he set a great example in a society that was, and still is, so preoccupied with class and accent."

Bloom has appeared in a number of plays and theatrical works in both London and New York. Those works include Look Back in Anger; Rashomon; 'Duel of Angels' (by Jean Giraudoux), co-starring with Vivien Leigh, in 1958; and Bloom's favourite role, that of Blanche DuBois, in a revival of the Tennessee Williams play, A Streetcar Named Desire, which played in London in 1974. Critic Clive Barnes described the play as a "notable example of what the classic revival should be – well groomed, but thoughtful, expressive, illuminating." Another critic writes that Bloom's portrayal of Blanche featured "remarkable layers of vitality and tenderness", and playwright Williams stated, "I declare myself absolutely wild about Claire Bloom."

Bloom has also performed in a one-woman show that included monologues from several of her stage performances. She also starred in the 1976 Broadway revival of The Innocents.

Film

Bloom's first film role was in the 1948 film The Blind Goddess. She trained at the Rank Organisation's charm school but did not stay with that company for long.

Her international screen debut came in the 1952 film Limelight, when she was chosen by Charlie Chaplin, who also directed, to co-star alongside him. The film catapulted Bloom to stardom. Biographer Dan Kamin states that Limelight is a similar story to Chaplin's City Lights, made twenty years earlier, in which Chaplin also helps a heroine overcome a physical handicap. In this film, Bloom plays a suicidal ballerina who "suffers from hysterical paralysis".

The film had personal meaning for Chaplin as it contained numerous references to his life and family: the theatre where he and Bloom performed in the film was the same theatre where his mother gave her last performance; Bloom was directed by Chaplin to wear dresses similar to those his mother used to wear; Chaplin's sons and his half-brother all had parts. Bloom states that she felt one of the reasons she got the part was because she closely resembled his young wife, Oona O'Neill. In his autobiography, Chaplin writes that he had no doubt the film would be a success: "I had fewer qualms about its success than any picture I had ever made." Chaplin explains his decision to make Bloom co-star despite this being her first film:

She was subsequently featured in a number of "costume" roles in films such as Alexander the Great (1956), The Brothers Karamazov (1958), The Buccaneer (1958), and The Wonderful World of the Brothers Grimm (1962). Bloom also appeared in Laurence Olivier's film version of Richard III (1955), in which she played Lady Anne, Ibsen's A Doll's House (1973) for which she won Best Actress award at Taormina International Film Festival, The Outrage (1964) with Paul Newman and Laurence Harvey, as well as the films Look Back in Anger (1959) and The Spy Who Came in from the Cold (1965), both with Richard Burton. Of Bloom's character in Spy, novelist David Plante writes that "Claire's refined beauty appears to be one with the refinement of a culture she represents as an actress."

In the 1960s she began to play more contemporary roles, including an unhinged housewife in The Chapman Report, a psychologist opposite Cliff Robertson's Oscar-winning role in Charly, and Theodora in The Haunting. She also appeared in the Woody Allen films Crimes and Misdemeanors (1989) and Mighty Aphrodite (1995). She appeared in the Sylvester Stallone film Daylight (1996). She played Hera in Clash of the Titans. Laurence Olivier played Zeus, her husband; she had also played his wife, Queen Anne in Richard III (1955). Her most recent appearances in films were her portrayal of Queen Mary in the 2010 Oscar winning British film The King's Speech and her portrayal of Eva Rose opposite Jerry Lewis in the 2016 film Max Rose.

Television
Bloom has appeared in numerous roles on television such as her portrayal of Lady Marchmain in Brideshead Revisited (1981). In 1996, she wrote, "I still find it puzzling when I am told I played a manipulative and heartless woman; that is not how I saw her. Lady Marchmain is deeply religious, and her dilemma includes trying to raise a wilful brood of children on her own, while instilling them with her rigid observance of the Catholic code. Sebastian is both an alcoholic and a homosexual, and from her point of view, he lives in a state of mortal sin. She has to fight for his soul by any means in her power, with the knowledge that her efforts may lead to his destruction. A born crusader, the Marchioness confronts her difficult choices head on; her rigidity of purpose, which I don't in any way share, is understandable in context. The aspect that rings most true is her sense of being an outsider, a Catholic in Protestant England. Not such a leap from being a Jew in Protestant England as one would imagine."

Other work includes two prominent BBC Television productions for director Rudolph Cartier: co-starring with Sean Connery in Anna Karenina (1961), and playing Cathy in Wuthering Heights with Keith Michell as Heathcliff (1962). She also appeared as First Lady Edith Wilson in Backstairs at the White House (1979); as Joy Gresham, the wife of C.S. Lewis in Shadowlands for which she received the BAFTA Award as Best Actress (1985); as Marina Gregg in The Mirror Crack'd from Side to Side, the last of the BBC Miss Marple adaptations in 1992; and as the older Sophy in the serial The Camomile Lawn (1992) on Britain's Channel 4. Her most recent appearance in a mini-series was in the 2006 version of The Ten Commandments.

On continuing television series, she has appeared on the New York-based Law & Order: Criminal Intent. From 1994 to 1995, she portrayed villainess Orlena Grimaldi on the daytime drama As the World Turns. She also had major roles in several of the BBC-Shakespeare Play television presentations and has led workshops on Shakespearean performance practices. In 2003, Bloom did a stage reading of Milton's Samson Agonistes along with actor John Neville at Bryn Mawr College at the behest of poet Karl Kirchwey.

Later appearances
In December 2006, she appeared on the London stage in Arthur Allan Seidelman's production of Six Dance Lessons in Six Weeks by Richard Alfieri, a two-hander in which she co-starred with Billy Zane.

In October 2007, she appeared opposite Peter Bowles in Love Letters at the Théâtre Princesse Grace, Monte Carlo, directed by Marc Sinden, as part of his British Theatre Season, Monaco.

In 2008, she guest starred in New Tricks as actress Helen Brownlow. The story concerned the murder of Brownlow's husband whilst they were in a play together.

In December 2009 and January 2010, she appeared in the two-part Doctor Who story "The End of Time" as a mysterious Time Lord credited only as "The Woman". Series executive producer Russell T. Davies revealed in his 2010 book The Writer's Tale that the character is supposed to be the Doctor's mother.

In 2010, she guest starred as Jill Peters in The Bill in the episode "Taking a Stand" and played Queen Mary in The King's Speech.

In September 2012, she appeared in concert at the Joseph Meyerhoff Symphony Hall, Baltimore, Maryland, as the narrator in a performance of Leonard Bernstein's Kaddish, with the Baltimore Symphony Orchestra conducted by Marin Alsop. In 2013, Bloom appeared in the sixth series of ITV's Doc Martin as the estranged mother of the title character. In 2015 she appeared as Matilda Stowe in ITV's Midsomer Murders episode 17.4, "A Vintage Murder".

In 2019, she appeared as Aunt Mary in the Stephen Poliakoff BBC TV mini-series, Summer of Rockets.

Personal life
Bloom has married three times. Her first marriage, in 1959, was to actor Rod Steiger, whom she met when they both performed in the play Rashomon. Their daughter is opera singer Anna Steiger. Steiger and Bloom divorced in 1969. In that same year, Bloom married producer Hillard Elkins. The marriage lasted three years and the couple divorced in 1972. Bloom's third marriage on 29 April 1990, was to writer Philip Roth, her longtime companion. They divorced in 1995.

Bloom has written two memoirs about her life and career. The first, Limelight and After: The Education of an Actress, was published in 1982 and was an in-depth look at her career and the film and stage roles she had portrayed. Her second book, Leaving a Doll's House: A Memoir, published in 1996, went into greater details about her personal life; she discussed not only her marriages but also her affairs with Richard Burton, Laurence Olivier, and Yul Brynner. The book created a stir when Bloom described her former marriage to Roth. Soon after, Roth wrote a "revenge novel" I Married a Communist (1998), in which the character of Eve Frame appeared to represent Bloom.

Honours
Bloom was appointed a Commander of the Order of the British Empire (CBE) in the 2013 Birthday Honours for services to drama.

Filmography

Film

Television

References

External links 
 
 
 
  while receiving a Lifetime Acting Award at the Fort Lauderdale International Film Festival, 2010, video 9 min.
 Selected performances in University of Bristol Theatre Archive

1931 births
20th-century English actresses
21st-century English actresses
Living people
English film actresses
English stage actresses
English television actresses
English voice actresses
Jewish English actresses
Best Actress BAFTA Award (television) winners
BAFTA Most Promising Newcomer to Leading Film Roles winners
Commanders of the Order of the British Empire
Actresses from London
Alumni of the Royal Central School of Speech and Drama
Alumni of the Guildhall School of Music and Drama
People from Finchley
People educated at Badminton School
English people of German-Jewish descent
English people of Russian-Jewish descent